The Hitachi DX07 is a 2.9 inch (73 mm) liquid crystal display screen which went into mass production in December 2006:
62mm x 37mm
800x480 pixels
1.677 million colours
400:1 contrast ratio
250cd/m2
IPS TFT (in-plane switching)

Each pixel is therefore 78µm x 77µm (1µm = 1/1000mm).

Note: It's also safe to assume that this is an 8-bit per channel display (a 6-bit per channel display can only dither 1.62 million colours)

Optical Properties of the DX07
The DX07 has a number of interesting properties related to its small size and high resolution.  The following are true for someone with "normal" vision using this screen as a hand held device:
Smallest pixel size to comfortably view a hand held device without loss of detail
Smallest hand held screen without loss of detail for NTSC DVB content (720x480 pixels)
Smallest hand held screen without loss of detail for NTSC DVD content (720x480 pixels)

Notes:
"Normal" vision is when someone can distinguish detail at 1/60 of a degree (an arcminute)
The closest a hand held screen can comfortably be viewed is 250mm (approx. 10 inches)

Smallest Visible Pixel Size for a Hand Held Device
The smallest visible pixel size (p) for a hand held device can be calculated assuming the screen is held at a comfortable distance (250mm) for someone with "normal" vision (able to see detail at a 1/60 degree angle):

It can therefore be concluded that the pixel size for the Hitachi DX07 screen is only 5% greater than the smallest possible for practical use.

Note: Smaller pixel sizes would dither in much the same way as printed dots (72.7µm is approximately 350dpi)

Other Hand Held Screen Sizes
If other hand held devices were manufactured for the latest high-definition video screen, then their smallest sizes without loss of detail (i.e. 72.7µm pixels) would be as follows:

External links
 Hitachi DX07 press release (English)
Hitachi DX07 press release (Japanese)
BeHardware's Test: the influence of electronic components on LCD colors

Hitachi products
Liquid crystal displays
Display devices